Agave utahensis is a species of agave known by the common name Utah agave.

Varieties of the species include the Nevada agave and Kaibab agave.

It is an uncommon plant of the United States' desert southwest, in the states of Utah, Nevada, Arizona, and California. Although plants in some areas are threatened, overall the species is stable and is considered to be of Least Concern by the IUCN.

Description
Agave utahensis is a rosette-shaped agave having blue-green sharp-spiked leaves.

The raceme inflorescence is very tall, reaching a maximum of 4 m (12 ft). It is generally yellow or yellow-green with bulbous yellow flowers. The fruits are capsules 1 to 3 centimeters long and containing black seed.

Uses
Agave utahensis is cultivated as an ornamental plant. In the UK it has won the Royal Horticultural Society's Award of Garden Merit.

The plant was used for food and fiber by local Native American peoples such as the Havasupai. Among the Navajo, the plant is used to make blankets.

References

External links
Jepson Manual Treatment
USDA Plants Profile
Univ. of Mich. Dearborn — Ethnobotany
Interactive Distribution Map of Agave utahensis
Agave utahensis U.C. Photo gallery

utahensis
Flora of Arizona
Flora of California
Flora of Nevada
Flora of Utah
Flora of the California desert regions
Natural history of the Mojave Desert
Taxa named by George Engelmann
Plants used in Native American cuisine
Plants described in 1871